Ealing, Acton and Shepherd's Bush was a parliamentary constituency represented in the House of Commons of the Parliament of the United Kingdom.   It elected one Member of Parliament (MP) by the first past the post system of election. The constituency was abolished at the 2010 general election when it was divided between the new seats of Ealing Central and Acton and Hammersmith, with then incumbent Andy Slaughter becoming MP for the latter seat.

History

Boundaries
The constituency incorporated the easternmost section of the London Borough of Ealing (covering Ealing and Acton) as well as the northern part of the London Borough of Hammersmith and Fulham (covering Shepherd's Bush and White City).

The constituency was made up of the following electoral wards:

From the London Borough of Ealing: Hanger Lane; Heathfield; Southfield; Springfield; Vale; Victoria.
From the London Borough of Hammersmith and Fulham: College Park and Old Oak; Coningham; Starch Green; White City and Shepherd's Bush; Wormholt.

Boundary changes which took effect at the 2010 general election erased the constituency. The section which fell within the London Borough of Ealing was combined with parts of central Ealing to create a new Ealing Central and Acton constituency, whilst the area falling within the London Borough of Hammersmith & Fulham (namely Shepherd's Bush) was combined with the northern part of the old Hammersmith and Fulham constituency to create a new Hammersmith seat.

Members of Parliament

Elections

Elections in the 2000s

Elections in the 1990s

See also
 List of parliamentary constituencies in London
 Clive Soley
 Justine Greening
 Ealing Central and Acton

References 

Politics of the London Borough of Ealing
Constituencies of the Parliament of the United Kingdom established in 1997
Constituencies of the Parliament of the United Kingdom disestablished in 2010
Parliamentary constituencies in London (historic)
Shepherd's Bush
Acton, London